Molyneux's problem is a thought experiment in philosophy concerning immediate recovery from blindness. It was first formulated by William Molyneux, and notably referred to in John Locke's An Essay Concerning Human Understanding (1689). The problem can be stated in brief, "if a man born blind can feel the differences between shapes such as spheres and cubes, could he, if given the ability to see, distinguish those objects by sight alone, in reference to the tactile schemata he already possessed?"

Original correspondence
The question was originally posed to Locke by philosopher William Molyneux, whose wife was blind:

To which John Locke responds in An Essay Concerning Human Understanding (emphasis added):

Responses
In 1709, in An Essay Towards a New Theory of Vision, George Berkeley also concluded that there was no necessary connection between a tactile world and a sight world—that a connection between them could be established only on the basis of experience. He speculated:

In 1749, Denis Diderot wrote Letter on the blind for the benefit of those who see as a criticism of our knowledge of ultimate reality.

A similar problem was also addressed earlier in the 12th century by Ibn Tufail (Abubacer), in his philosophical novel, Hayy ibn Yaqdhan (Philosophus Autodidactus). His version of the problem, however, dealt mainly with colors rather than shapes:

Regarding Molyneux's problem, the authors Asif A. Ghazanfar & Hjalmar K. Turesson (2008) have recently noted:

One reason that Molyneux's Problem could be posed in the first place is the extreme dearth of human subjects who gain vision after extended congenital blindness.  Alberto Valvo estimated that fewer than twenty cases have been known in the last 1000 years.  Ostrovsky, et al., studied a woman who gained sight at the age of 12 when she underwent surgery for dense bilateral congenital cataracts.  They report that the subject could recognize family members by sight six months after surgery, but took up to a year to recognize most household objects purely by sight.

In 2003, Pawan Sinha, a professor at the Massachusetts Institute of Technology, set up a program in the framework of the Project Prakash and eventually had the opportunity to find five individuals who satisfied the requirements for an experiment aimed at answering Molyneux's question experimentally.  Prior to treatment, the subjects (aged 8 to 17) were only able to discriminate between light and dark, with two of them also being able to determine the direction of a bright light. The surgical treatments took place between 2007 and 2010, and quickly brought the relevant subject from total congenital blindness to fully seeing.  A carefully designed test was submitted to each subject within the next 48 hours.  Based on its result, the experimenters concluded that the answer to Molyneux's problem is, in short, "no". Although after restoration of sight, the subjects could distinguish between objects visually almost as effectively as they would do by touch alone, they were unable to form the connection between an object perceived using the two different senses. The correlation was barely better than if the subjects had guessed.  They had no innate ability to transfer their tactile shape knowledge to the visual domain.  However, the experimenters could test three of the five subjects on later dates (5 days, 7 days, and 5 months after, respectively) and found that the performance in the touch-to-vision case improved significantly, reaching 80–90%.

See also
 Eşref Armağan
 Mike May (skier)
 Mary's room

References

Further reading
 Taine, Hippolyte (1870). De l'intelligence. Paris.

External links
 
 
1688 in England
1680s introductions
Blindness
Concepts in epistemology
Empiricism
John Locke
Philosophical problems
Somatosensory system
Thought experiments in philosophy